Harold Davis may refer to:

H. L. Davis (1894–1960), Pulitzer Prize-winning novelist
Harold A. Davis, pulp fiction author working under the pseudonym Kenneth Robeson, 1930s, 1940s
Harold Davis (American football) (1934–2007), American quarterback
Harold Davis (footballer) (1933–2018), Scottish footballer who played for Rangers F.C.
Harold Davis (sprinter) (1921–2007), American sprinter and former world record holder
Harold Davis (photographer) (born 1953), American photographer and author
Harold Thayer Davis (1892–1974), American mathematician

See also
Harold Davies (disambiguation)
Harry Davis (disambiguation)